Henri Cochet defeated Giorgio de Stefani 6–0, 6–4, 4–6, 6–3 in the final to win the men's singles tennis title at the 1932 French Championships.

Seeds
The seeded players are listed below. Henri Cochet is the champion; others show the round in which they were eliminated.

  Henri Cochet (champion)
  Fred Perry (quarterfinals)
  Sidney Wood (third round)
  Jiro Satoh (fourth round)
  Christian Boussus (fourth round)
  Giorgio de Stefani (finalist)
  Roderich Menzel (semifinals)
  Gregory Mangin (quarterfinals)
  Paul Féret (third round)
  Jacques Brugnon (fourth round)
  André Merlin (third round)
  George Rogers Lyttelton (quarterfinals)
  Marcel Bernard (semifinals)
  Gottfried von Cramm (second round)
  Franz Matejka (fourth round)
  Patrick Hughes (fourth round)

Draw

Key
 Q = Qualifier
 WC = Wild card
 LL = Lucky loser
 r = Retired

Finals

Earlier rounds

Section 1

Section 2

Section 3

Section 4

Section 5

Section 6

Section 7

Section 8

References

External links
   on the French Open website

French Championships - Men's Singles
French Championships (tennis) by year – Men's singles